Fereydoon Abbasi-Davani (born 11 July 1958) is an Iranian nuclear scientist who was head of the Atomic Energy Organization from 2011 to 2013. He survived an assassination attempt in 2010, but was seriously wounded. He is a conservative and principlist politician.

Early life and education
Abbasi was born in Abadan, Iran, on 11 July 1958. According to Mashregh News, an Iranian news website, he holds a PhD in nuclear physics.

Career
Abbasi was a professor of nuclear physics at Shahid Beheshti University and has reportedly been a member of Iran's Islamic Revolutionary Guard Corps (IRGC) since the 1979 Islamic Revolution. He reportedly did nuclear research at the Atomic Energy Organization of Iran (AEOI). Prior to his appointment as head of the AEOI he chaired the physics department at Tehran's Imam Hossein University.

Abbasi was appointed head of AEOI by then President Mahmoud Ahmadinejad on 13 February 2011 to succeed Ali Akbar Salehi. In his tenure the AEOI was unwilling to cooperate with the International Atomic Energy Agency (IAEA). In fact in May 2011 Fereydoon Abbasi was the recipient of a letter from the IAEA, where its Director General Yukiya Amano reiterated the agency's concerns about the "existence of a possible military dimension" to Iran's nuclear programme and stressed the importance of clarifying these issues, requesting prompt access to relevant locations, equipment, documentation and persons. In June 2011 Abbasi replied evasively, so much so that the IAEA Director could only repeat his request for credible assurances.

Abbasi was removed from office on 16 August 2013 and subsequently replaced by Salehi.

Controversy
Abbasi has regularly been linked to Iran's alleged efforts to make the nuclear weapon, a process called weaponization. According to an Institute for Science and International Security report citing an expert close to the International Atomic Energy Agency (IAEA), Abbasi was a key scientist in the alleged Iranian covert nuclear weapons program headed by Mohsen Fakhrizadeh-Mahabadi, a strong supporter of Iran's alleged nuclear weapons program. Abbasi personally directed work to calculate the yield of a nuclear weapon as well as work on high energy neutron sources, this expert added.

According to the same report, the IAEA had information that Abbasi was the head of the Institute of Applied Physics (IAP), which was a follow-on organization to the Physics Research Center. Both of the organizations acted as fronts for scientific work on a possible Iranian nuclear weapons program.

Designation by the UN
Abbasi is "listed in an annex to U.N. Security Council Resolution 1747 of 24 March 2007, as a person involved in Iran's nuclear or ballistic missile activities". This resolution imposes an asset freeze and travel notification requirements. Abbasi is described as a "Senior Ministry of Defence and Armed Forces Logistics (MODAFL) scientist with links to the Institute of Applied Physics, working closely with Mahabadi (also designated by the UN).

Assassination attempt
On 29 November 2010, Abbasi was seriously wounded and narrowly survived an assassination attempt on a Tehran street, as a man on a motorbike attached a bomb to his car as he drove to work. A separate similar bomb attack the same day killed another scientist, Dr. Majid Shahriari, who also taught at Shahid Beheshti University.

See also
 Atomic Energy Organization of Iran

References

External links

|-

1958 births
Living people
People from Kazerun
Iranian physicists
International Atomic Energy Agency officials
Academic staff of Imam Hossein University
Shahid Beheshti University alumni
YEKTA Front politicians
Presidents of the Atomic Energy Organization of Iran
Iran–Israel proxy conflict
Failed assassination attempts in Asia